James Garrett may refer to:

 James P. Garrett (1922–2015), Oklahoma state court judge
 James Ramsey Garrett (1817–1855), Irish ornithologist
 James Rube Garrett Jr. (1922–2011), U.S. Marine and author of A Marine Diary
 James Leo Garrett Jr. (1925–2020), American professor of theology
 Jesse James Garrett, experience designer, known for having coined the term Ajax
 Jim Garrett (1930–2018), American football player, coach, and scout
 James Garrett (Zoey 101), character on the TV series Zoey 101
 James Garrett, voice actor known for voicing butler Alfred Pennyworth in three DC Comics Batman and Roku in Avatar: The Last Airbender